Elizabeth Colina Katayama (nee McDonald; 9 October 19124 September 1998) was an Australian writer known by the pseudonym Elizabeth Kata, best known for Be Ready with Bells and Drums (1961), made into the award-winning film A Patch of Blue (1965).

Biography
She was born of Scottish parents in Sydney in 1912. After marrying the Japanese pianist Shinshiro Katayama in 1937, she lived for 10 years in Japan. During the last years of World War II, she was interned at the mountain resort village of Karuizawa, Nagano. She returned to Australia in 1947 with her baby son David, battling the Australian government for permission.

As well as writing novels, she wrote for television and several Hollywood scripts. Her first novel, Be Ready with Bells and Drums (written in 1959, first published in 1961), was produced as the film A Patch of Blue (1965). Guy Green, who directed, adapted Kata's book and his screenplay was nominated for a Writers Guild of America award.  After the success of the film, the novel was re-released as A Patch of Blue. The book was for many years included in the "school book list" both in the U.S. and Australia. The book Mrs Katayama and Her Splash of Blue (2010, Independence Jones), covers how Elizabeth Kata's first book became the film A Patch of Blue.

Elizabeth Katayama died in Sydney in 1998.

Works
Be Ready with Bells and Drums (1961; re-published as A Patch of Blue)
Someone Will Conquer Them (1962)
 Look Back in Horror
Tilda (1979)
Child of the Holocaust (1980)
The Death of Ruth (1981)
With Kisses on Both Cheeks (1981)
Sarah (1982)
Kagami (1989)

References

External links
 http://www.austlit.edu.au/run?ex=ShowAgent&agentId=A)yV
 http://catalogue.nla.gov.au/Search/Home?lookfor=author:%22Kata,%20Elizabeth%22&iknowwhatimean=1
 

1912 births
1998 deaths
20th-century Australian novelists
Australian women novelists
Australian expatriates in Japan
20th-century Australian women writers
Writers from Sydney
Australian people of Scottish descent
World War II civilian prisoners held by Japan
Pseudonymous women writers
20th-century pseudonymous writers